Air Commodore Nicholas Bray,  is a Royal Air Force officer. He served as Commandant-General of the RAF Regiment from 2012 to 2013.

Military career
On 29 July 1983, the then Aircraftman Bray was commissioned into the Security Branch of the Royal Air Force as an acting pilot officer. He was given the service number 8024046L. He was regraded to pilot officer on 29 January 1984. He was promoted to flying officer on 29 January 1986, and to flight lieutenant on 29 January 1990. He served in the former Republic of Yugoslavia from April to November 1993, for which he was awarded  a Queen's Commendation for Valuable Service 'in recognition of [his] services". As part of the half-yearly promotions, he was promoted to squadron leader on 1 January 1996, and to wing commander on 1 January 2001.

On 1 July 2007, he was promoted to group captain. He was appointed station commander of RAF Honington in February 2009. In 2011, as part of the NATO Training Mission-Afghanistan, he served as an adviser in the Ministry of the Interior. He also acted as the lead planner of the Afghan National Police. Appointed a Commander of the Order of the British Empire  in the 2012 New Year Honours, Bray was made Commandant-General of the RAF Regiment in January the same year. In May 2013, he relinquished the appointment.

On 16 October 2017, he was granted a commission in the Royal Auxiliary Air Force in the rank of air commodore.

References

External links
Air of Authority – A History of RAF Organisation – Air Commodore N Bray

Commanders of the Order of the British Empire
Living people
Recipients of the Commendation for Valuable Service
Royal Air Force personnel of the War in Afghanistan (2001–2021)
Royal Air Force airmen
Royal Air Force Regiment officers
Year of birth missing (living people)